Eduardo Henrique Gomes Penido (born January 23, 1960) is a Brazilian sailor and Olympic champion. He won one gold medal in the 470 Class with Marcos Soares at the 1980 Summer Olympics in Moscow.

Penido is the current chairman of the Rio de Janeiro Sailing Federation (Federação de Vela do Estado do Rio de Janeiro).

References

External links

1960 births
Living people
Brazilian male sailors (sport)
Sailors at the 1980 Summer Olympics – 470
Olympic sailors of Brazil
Olympic gold medalists for Brazil
Olympic medalists in sailing
Medalists at the 1980 Summer Olympics